Romeo Acquarone (1895 – 1980) was a professional tennis player born in Monaco.  He became a French citizen in 1937. Acquarone won the Bristol Cup in France in 1920 (beating Joseph Negro in the final). The Bristol Cup was the top professional tournament in the world in the 1920s.

References

1895 births
1980 deaths
French male tennis players
Monegasque emigrants to France
Professional tennis players before the Open Era